Rhene flavicomans, known as the wasp-mimic jumping spider, is a species of spider in the genus Rhene. It is found in Bhutan, India, Sri Lanka and Thailand.

References

External links
Drawings of Rhene flavicomans

Salticidae
Spiders of Asia
Spiders described in 1902